| tries               = {{#expr: 
+10 +7 +2 +6 +1 +5 +4 +5 +2 +5 +0 +8 +3 +4 +3 +3 
+5 +14 +5 +8 +4 +6 +9 +6 +8 +8 +1 +2 +8 +4 +5 +5 
+3 +8 +3 +6 +6 +1 +6 +4 +4 +7 +4 +7 +8 +3 +4 +4 
+2 +5 +5 +4 +5 +3 +3 
}}
| top point scorer    = (80 points)
| top try scorer      = (6 tries)
| venue               = Musgrave Park, Cork
| attendance2         = 2,500
| champions           =  Munster A
| count               = 1
| runner-up           =  Cross Keys
| website             = 
| previous year       = 2010–11
| previous tournament = 2010–11 British and Irish Cup
| next year           = 2012–13
| next tournament     = 2012–13 British and Irish Cup
}}

The 2011–12 British and Irish Cup was the 3rd season of the annual rugby union competition for second tier, semi-professional clubs from Britain and Ireland.  First round matches began on Wednesday 21 September 2011 and the final was held on Friday 27 April 2012.

Defending champions Bristol had a very poor campaign and were unable to make it out of the pool stages.  Munster A lifted the cup, comfortably defeating Cross Keys 31–12 in the final.  They became the first Irish side to claim the title, and the third different side to win in the competition's three-year history.

Teams
The allocation of teams is as follows:

 – 12 clubs from RFU Championship
 – 3 Irish provinces represented by 'A' teams.
 – 3 top clubs from the Scottish Premiership.
 – 6 top clubs from the Welsh Premier Division.

Competition format 
The pool stage saw a change in format and consisted of six pools of four teams playing cross-pool matches, giving each team two home and two away matches. Matches between English teams were played mid-week. Pool matches took place from 21 September to 18 December. The top team from each pool qualified for the quarter-finals, together with the two runners–up with the best records.

 Pool 1 teams Ayr, Cornish Pirates, Moseley and Neath,  played the teams in Pool 2  Bristol Rugby, Cross Keys, Plymouth Albion and Munster
 Pool 3 teams Aberavon, Bedford Blues, Leinster and London Scottish,  played the teams in Pool 4: Esher Rugby, Llanelli, London Welsh and Melrose
 Pool 5: Currie, Doncaster, Rotherham and Pontypridd,  played the teams in Pool 6: Leeds Carnegie, Nottingham Rugby, Swansea and Ulster Ravens

Pool stages

Pool 1 v Pool 2

Pool 3 v Pool 4

Pool 5 v Pool 6

Knock–out stages

Qualifiers 
The six pool winners and the two best runners up proceeded to the knock out stages.  The best four qualifiers (pool winners) had home advantage in the quarter finals.

Quarter-finals

Semi-finals

Final

Top scorers

Top points scorers

Top try scorers

Geography

References

External links 
  Unofficial British and Irish Cup website - latest news, teams etc

British and Irish Cup
2011–12 rugby union tournaments for clubs
2011–12 RFU Championship
2011–12 in Irish rugby union
2011–12 in Welsh rugby union
2011–12 in Scottish rugby union
2011–12 in British rugby union